Randy Paul Gage (born April 6, 1959) is an American author and motivational speaker. He is known for writing self-help books and lectures on success and prosperity.

Early life and education
Gage was raised by his mother. After being charged with armed robbery at age 15 to fund a drug deal, he was expelled from Madison West High School and served time in juvenile jail. Released on probation in 1975, he moved to Miami, Florida and worked as a dishwasher in a Pancake house on minimum wage, becoming a manager at the age of 16. At the age of 20, he started in the network marketing industry with Amway. At 30 he opened his second pizza restaurant, but after it failed was left heavily in debt.

Career
Gage is an American author who has written 13 books.

In 2001, he published How to Build a Multi-level Money Machine: The Science of Network Marketing, a book about success in the network marketing business. Gage has since written 12 other books,  including two New York Times bestsellers, the John Wiley & Sons published 2012 best seller Risky is the New Safe, and 2016, Mad Genius. He has also authored a series of self-help audio and video materials, releasing over 50 resources, translated into 25 languages. As well as coaching around the subject of prosperity, Gage also lectures globally. A report about his book, Why You're Dumb, Sick and Broke...And How to Get Smart, Healthy and Rich!, says that "Gage asserts [in the book] that many of us have prejudices about wealth and false beliefs about success that are holding us back." An article published in March 2013 by Forbes featured Gage's work as one of the most disruptive marketing trends of 2013.

A member of the National Speakers Association (NSA), in July 2013 Gage was inducted into the NSA's Council of Peers Award for Excellence (CPAE) Speaker Hall of Fame, and at the same event won NSA's Nido Qubein Philanthropist of the Year Award.

Personal life
Gage currently lives in San Diego, California after having lived in the Miami metropolitan area of Florida until 2013. After being shot in Miami in 2000, Gage is a philanthropic and activist speaker/supporter of Shawne Duperon's Project: Forgive.

Publications

References

External links
Bio @ Business Week

1959 births
Writers from Madison, Wisconsin
Writers from Miami
American businesspeople
American business writers
American motivational writers
American self-help writers
American motivational speakers
Life coaches
Writers from San Diego
Living people
People associated with direct selling
Madison West High School alumni